Robert Dennis Madge is an actor and playwright.

They attended Sylvia Young Theatre School from 2007–2012. From 2012–2014, they studied Drama at Ashbourne College. In 2017, Robert graduated from the University of Warwick, where they read English Literature and were president of Music Theatre Warwick. Robert has played various roles on the West End, as well as other theatres in the United Kingdom, as well as performing the lead role of Nobody Owens in HarperAudio's full-cast edition of The Graveyard Book.

Career 
Madge discovered their love for performing at a young age and made their professional debut at the age of 9, when they starred as Michael Banks in the Original West End production of George Stiles and Anthony Drewe's Mary Poppins at the Prince Edward Theatre from 2005 to 2007. They then landed the role of the Artful Dodger in the West End revival of Oliver!, shortly followed by their acclaimed performance as Gavroche in Les Misérables at the Barbican Theatre as well as getting the opportunity to perform the role in the 2010 Les Misérables: 25th Anniversary Concert.

Having played three of the highest profile child roles within the Musical Theatre industry, Madge was selected to play Reginald in the original cast of Matilda the Musical between 2010 and 2011. This meant that by the age of 15, Madge had already performed in four West End shows and was an established name within the theatre world.

Madge played their first adult role in the Les Misérables UK and Ireland tour, playing the role of student, Jean Prouvaire. This however was cut short due to the COVID-19 pandemic. 

In August 2021, Madge began touring as Norton the fish in Bedknobs and Broomsticks, which premiered at the Theatre Royal in Newcastle upon Tyne. They followed this with a month's run at The Other Palace, starring in a new musical, 'Millenials: A Pop Song Cycle', in July 2022.

My Son's a Queer But What Can You Do?
My Son's a Queer But What Can You Do? is a one-person play written and performed by Madge (with songs by Madge and Pippa Cleary), directed by Luke Sheppard, which is a coming of age, autobiographical story of Madge when they were a child attempting to stage a full-blown one-person Disney show in their home; it also explores Madge's uplifting and inspiring discovery that they are non-binary. 

They first performed the show at the Turbine Theatre in June 2021, then a revival at the Edinburgh Fringe Festival in August 2022. The show transferred to the West End at the Garrick Theatre in October 2022 and the Ambassadors Theatre in January 2023 for limited runs. The show won the 2022 WhatsOnStage Award for Best Off-West End show in 2022 and is nominated for the 2023 Laurence Olivier Award for Best Entertainment or Comedy Play.

Stage credits

Personal Life 
Madge is non-binary.

References

External links 

Robert Madge on Twitter
Robert Madge on Instagram

1996 births
Living people
Alumni of the Sylvia Young Theatre School
People from Warwickshire
English child actors
English stage actors
English television actors
British non-binary actors